Michael Constantino (born February 5, 1969) is a former U.S. soccer forward. He earned one cap with the U.S. national team and was a member of the U.S. team at the 1987 FIFA World Youth Championship.

Youth
Constantino graduated from the Friends Academy where he was a 1986 Parade Magazine High School All American soccer player.  He attended the University of Pennsylvania where he played on the men’s soccer team in 1986 and then from 1988 to 1990. He took the 1987 season off to play with the United States U-20 men's national soccer team. He returned to Penn in 1988 and completed his four seasons in 1990. He scored thirty career goals and was All Ivy League in 1986 and 1988.  In May 2005, he was named to the University of Penn all century soccer team.

National teams
In 1987, Constantino was selected for the U.S. team which went to the U-20 World Cup in Chile.  Constantino played all three games as the U.S. went 1-2 in group play; failing to qualify for the second round. Constantino earned his lone cap with the United States men's national soccer team in a 1-0 loss to Guatemala on January 10, 1988 in Guatemala City. He came off for Joey Kirk.

Post-playing career
In July 1996, Constantino was hired by Bear Stearns. He remained with the company for twelve years, moving to GMAC in September 2008.

References

External links
 

1969 births
American soccer players
Living people
Penn Quakers men's soccer players
United States men's international soccer players
United States men's under-20 international soccer players
Soccer players from New York (state)
Association football forwards